Elkville is a village in Jackson County, Illinois, United States. The population was 928 at the 2010 census, down from 1,001 at the 2000 census. As of 2018 the estimated population was 871.

History
The village was named for the elk which frequented mineral licks near the original town site. Harmon P. Burroughs (1846–1907), farmer and Illinois state representative, lived in Elkville.

Geography
Elkville is located in northeastern Jackson County at  (37.910851, −89.235198). U.S. Route 51 runs through the center of the village, leading north  to Du Quoin and south the same distance to De Soto.

Demographics

As of the 2000 United States Census, there were 1,001 people, 400 households, and 289 families residing in the village. The racial makeup of the village was 95.00% White, 2.90% African American, 0.80% Native American, 0.20% from other races, and 1.10% from two or more races. Hispanic or Latino of any race were 1.90% of the population.

There were 400 households, out of which 34.5% had children under the age of 18 living with them, 55.0% were married couples living together, 12.0% had a female householder with no husband present, and 27.8% were non-families. 24.5% of all households were made up of individuals, and 13.8% had someone living alone who was 65 years of age or older. The average household size was 2.47 and the average family size was 2.91.

In the village, the population was spread out, with 26.5% under the age of 18, 10.1% from 18 to 24, 28.0% from 25 to 44, 21.2% from 45 to 64, and 14.3% who were 65 years of age or older. The median age was 34 years. For every 100 females, there were 97.4 males. For every 100 females age 18 and over, there were 94.7 males.

The median income for a household in the village was $27,969, and the median income for a family was $30,417. Males had a median income of $25,833 versus $17,727 for females. The per capita income for the village was $12,475. About 17.3% of families and 21.2% of the population were below the poverty line, including 33.0% of those under age 18 and 11.0% of those age 65 or over.

Education
Elverado CUSD No. 196

References

Villages in Jackson County, Illinois
Villages in Illinois
Populated places in Southern Illinois